Jeppe is a predominantly Danish masculine given name and surname. Notable people with the name include:
Given name
Jeppe Aakjær (1866–1930), Danish poet and novelist
Jeppe Andersen (born 1992), Danish footballer
Jeppe Bay (born 1997), Danish badminton player
Jeppe Brandrup (born 1985), Danish footballer
Jeppe Brinch (born 1995), Danish footballer
Jeppe Curth (born 1984), Danish footballer
Jeppe Gertsen (born 1997), Danish footballer 
Jeppe Grønning (born 1991), Danish footballer
Jeppe Gjervig Gram (born 1976), Danish screenwriter 
Jeppe Hansen (born 1989), Danish footballer
Jeppe Hasseriis (aka Dynatron; born 1980), Danish music producer
Jeppe Hein (born 1974), Danish artist  
Jeppe Højbjerg (born 1995), Danish footballer
Jeppe Huldahl (born 1982), Danish golfer 
Jeppe Illum (born 1992), Danish footballer
Jeppe Jensen Kollat (born 1972), Danish lightweight rower
Jeppe Johnsson (born 1951), Swedish politician  
Jeppe Kjær (born 1985), Danish footballer
Jeppe Kjær (born 1994), Danish footballer
Jeppe Kofod (born 1974), Danish politician
Jeppe Laursen (born 1977), Danish singer-songwriter and music producer
Jeppe Ludvigsen (born 1989), Danish badminton player
Jeppe Mehl (born 1986), Danish footballer
Jeppe Moe (born 1995), Norwegian footballer
Jeppe Nielsen (born 1974), Danish freestyle swimmer
Jeppe Normann (born 1951), Norwegian fencer
Jeppe Okkels (born 1999), Danish footballer 
Jeppe Prætorius (1745–1823), Danish merchant and shipowner
Jeppe Riber (born 1985), Danish handballer
Jeppe Riddervold (born 1976), Danish songwriter, entrepreneur, and music publisher
Jeppe Rønde (born 1973), Danish filmmaker
Jeppe Simonsen (born 1995), Danish footballer 
Jeppe Svenningsen (born 1994), Danish footballer
Jeppe Tengbjerg (born 1973), Danish footballer and manager
Jeppe Tranholm-Mikkelsen (born 1962), Danish diplomat
Jeppe Tverskov (born 1993), Danish footballer  
Jeppe Vestergaard (born 1972), Danish footballer
Jeppe Bruun Wahlstrøm (aka Yepha; born 1983), Danish, singer, rapper and hip hop artist
Jeppe Wikström (born 1963), Swedish book publisher and photographer

Surname
Barbara Jeppe (1921–1999), South African botanical artist
Karen Jeppe (1876–1935), Danish missionary and social worker

References

Masculine given names
Danish masculine given names